The Associated Press (AP), New York Daily News (NYDN), The Sporting News (TSN), and United Press (UP) were among selectors of All-Pro teams comprising players adjudged to be the best at each position in the National Football League (NFL) during the 1954 NFL season. The AP, NYDN, and UP selected a first and second team.

References

External links
 1954 NFL All-Pros – Pro-Football-Reference

All-Pro Teams
1954 National Football League season